Joshua Lawson (born 22 July 1981) is an Australian actor and filmmaker best known for his role as Doug Gugghenheim in House of Lies, Tate in Superstore and as Kano in the 2021 film Mortal Kombat.

Early life
Lawson was born and raised in Brisbane, and attended St Joseph's College, Gregory Terrace. He graduated from the National Institute of Dramatic Art in 2001. He also spent one year studying improvisation techniques in Los Angeles at The Second City, The Groundlings, ACME Comedy Theatre and I.O. West. His older brother is actor Ben Lawson.

In 2003 Lawson was awarded a Mike Walsh Fellowship.

Career

Television
Lawson has had guest-starring roles in such popular Australian television programs as Blue Heelers and Home & Away, and is known for his appearances on the improv comedy program Thank God You're Here and on the Australian drama Sea Patrol and comedy The Librarians. He also had a guest role in the comedy Wilfred and starred in several television commercials, including advertisements for Coca-Cola Cherry and Gold Class cinemas.

He portrayed Tate Staskiewicz, the pharmacist in the series' titular setting, on the sitcom Superstore for three seasons.

Lawson also hosted Wipeout Australia with James Brayshaw.

Lawson played Ben in the American pilot Spaced and Shawn on Romantically Challenged for ABC. Since its inception in 2012, he has played management consultant Doug Guggenheim on Showtime's House of Lies.

In 2017 he played the title role in Hoges: The Paul Hogan Story.

Film
In 2006, Lawson made his feature film debut in BoyTown. He had the starring role in the 2012 Australian comedy film Any Questions for Ben?, created by Working Dog Productions. He also appeared alongside Will Ferrell and Zach Galifianakis in the 2010 comedy film The Campaign, as well as Anchorman 2: The Legend Continues and Crave.

His feature directing debut The Little Death which he also wrote and starred in, was released in 2014.

Lawson was nominated for an Academy Award for Best Live Action Short Film in 2018 for The Eleven O'Clock, a short film he wrote and starred in.

In 2018, Lawson portrayed "Dave Johnson" in the comedy pilot for the CBS series Here Comes the Neighborhood (later The Neighborhood), but was replaced by actor Max Greenfield before the series was picked up by the network.

In August 2019, Lawson was cast in the Mortal Kombat reboot as Kano.

Other work
During 2006 and 2007, Lawson was a regular guest co-host on the Australian radio comedy show Get This which aired on Triple M. In 2013, he voiced the role of Bob in the Cartoon Hangover short film Rocket Dog.

Filmography

References

External links
 

1981 births
20th-century Australian male actors
21st-century Australian male actors
Australian expatriate male actors in the United States
Australian male child actors
Australian male comedians
Australian male film actors
Australian male soap opera actors
Living people
Male actors from Brisbane
National Institute of Dramatic Art alumni
People educated at St Joseph's College, Gregory Terrace